Sir Thomas Domvile, 1st Baronet (c.1655 – 15 April 1721) was an Anglo-Irish politician.

On 21 December 1686, Domvile was created a baronet, of Templeogue in the Baronetage of Ireland. He was the Member of Parliament for Mullingar in the Irish House of Commons between 1692 and 1693. 

He was succeeded in his title by his son, Compton Domvile. His daughter, Bridget, married Henry Barry, 3rd Baron Barry of Santry.

References

Year of birth unknown
1721 deaths
17th-century Anglo-Irish people
18th-century Anglo-Irish people
Baronets in the Baronetage of Ireland
Thomas
Irish MPs 1692–1693
Members of the Parliament of Ireland (pre-1801) for County Westmeath constituencies